Agalliu is an Albanian surname. Notable people with the surname include:

Fatmir Agalliu, (1933–1998) Albanian scholar and writer
Neriada Agalliu Zenuni, (1976-), Albanian basketball player, relative of Fatmir 
Roland Agalliu, Albanian football player 

Albanian-language surnames